Noble Justice is the debut studio album by American rapper Young Noble, released on May 28, 2002.

Track listing

References

External links 
 OutlawzMedia.net Official Website

2002 debut albums
Albums produced by E.D.I.
Albums produced by Mike Dean (record producer)
Albums produced by L.T. Hutton
Outlaw Recordz albums
Young Noble albums